The Academic and Professional Unions (AF) was a national trade union centre in Norway, representing workers with a degree or equivalent qualification.

The federation was established in 1975, when the Federation of Higher Civil Servants merged with the Norwegian Association of Academics.  By 1996, it had 27 affiliates, with a total of 246,961 members.  However, that year, the Norwegian Medical Association disaffiliated, followed in 1997 by the Norwegian Civil Engineers' Association and several smaller unions, many of which formed the rival Federation of Norwegian Professional Associations.

The remainder of the federation tried to negotiate a merger with the Confederation of Vocational Unions, but could not agree terms.  Instead, in 2001, it dissolved, with most of its remaining affiliates forming the new Confederation of Unions for Professionals.

Affiliates
In 1983, the following unions were affiliated:

References

National trade union centers of Norway
1975 establishments in Norway
Trade unions established in 1975
Trade unions disestablished in 2001